The Massachusetts School of Art is an historic academic building at 364 Brookline Avenue in the Longwood Medical Area of Boston, Massachusetts.  The four-story Gothic/Art Deco building was designed by the architectural firm of Henry & Richmond, and was built in 1929-30 for the Massachusetts College of Art.  The school occupied the building until 1983, when it moved to its present campus on Huntington Avenue.  The building is now part of the Beth Israel Deaconess Medical Center.

The building was listed on the National Register of Historic Places in 1989 and is currently under study for landmark status by the Boston Landmarks Commission.

See also
National Register of Historic Places listings in southern Boston, Massachusetts

References

External links
 Massachusetts College of Art and Design

School buildings on the National Register of Historic Places in Massachusetts
Fenway–Kenmore
National Register of Historic Places in Boston